The following lists events that happened during 1849 in New Zealand.

Population
The estimated population of New Zealand at the end of 1849 is 67,000 Māori and 19,543 non-Māori.

Incumbents

Regal and viceregal
Head of State – Queen Victoria
Governor – Sir George Grey

Government and law
Chief Justice – William Martin
Lieutenant Governor, New Munster – Edward John Eyre
Lieutenant Governor, New Ulster – George Dean Pitt

Events 
 4 January:  The Māori language magazine, The Maori Messenger or Ko te Karere Maori publishes its first issue, replacing Te Karere o Nui Tireni which stopped publishing in 1846. The magazine continues under several titles until 1863.

Economy 
 The first coal mine in New Zealand is opened at Saddle Hill near Dunedin.

Sport

Horse racing
The committee which has been controlling the racing at Epsom ceases to function. (see also 1841)

Births
 6 February: John Aitken, Mayor of Wellington. 
 27 April (in India): Alfred Newman, Mayor of Wellington.

Deaths
 27 November: Te Rauparaha, tribal leader

See also
List of years in New Zealand
Timeline of New Zealand history
History of New Zealand
Military history of New Zealand
Timeline of the New Zealand environment
Timeline of New Zealand's links with Antarctica

References

External links